The Alice Springs Town Council is a local government area in the Northern Territory. On 1 July 1971, Alice Springs was gazetted as a Municipality with the town council elected on 25 July 1971.

History
The town of Alice Springs is located in Arrernte Country. Its traditional name is Mparntwe. Alice Springs is an established residential township with a commercial area and rural areas on the outskirts of the town. European settlement of the area dates from 1862.

The current mayor is Matt Paterson. In addition to the mayor, the Council contains eight other councillors.

14th Council (Current)

Mayorship

Councillors

13th Council

Mayorship

Councillors

12th Council

Mayorship

Councillors

Suburbs

 Alice Springs
 Araluen
 Arumbera
 Braitling
 Ciccone
 Connellan
 Desert Springs

 East Side
 Flynn
 Gillen
 Ilparpa
 Irlpme
 Kilgariff
 Larapinta

 Mount Johns
 Ross
 Sadadeen
 Stuart
 The Gap
 Undoolya
 White Gums

References

External links
 Alice Springs Town Council
 Alice Springs History

Local government areas of the Northern Territory
Alice Springs